The Bronx is The Bronx's debut LP, released on August 26, 2003, and the first recording by the band on Ferret Records. It is the first of five self-titled albums and was also released on the band's own White Drugs record label.

Release
The album was released in a digipack in Australia, Japan and the United Kingdom (U.K.). The Australian and UK versions contain a cover version of the X song "Los Angeles," while the Japanese CD, released on Sonic Label, featured four additional songs, including the X cover version. The X song was later released in the U.S. on the limited edition Tarantulas Records vinyl release, sold under license from the White Drugs label. The song "False Alarm" is featured as an on-disc playable song in the 2010 video game Rock Band 3.

Influence
Simon Ridley, drummer of Brisbane, Australia band DZ Deathrays identified the album as one of seven that changed his life and described it as "a psych up album for nights when I’m too tired but need to party." Ridley further explained: “Every song on this album is fucking rad!"

Track listing

Vinyl release
Limited edition: 1000 copies pressed on grey marble vinyl by the Tarantulas Records music company.

Members
Jorma Vik: drums
Matt Caughthran: vocals
Joby J. Ford: guitar
James Tweedy: bass guitar

References

External links
The Bronx Discogs page

The Bronx (band) albums
2003 debut albums
Shock Records albums